is a railway station in Aira, Kagoshima, Japan. It is operated by of JR Kyushu and is on the Nippō Main Line.

Lines

Layout 
The station consists of two side platforms serving two tracks at grade. The station building is a modern functional concrete structure which houses a waiting area, automatic ticket vending machines, a SUGOCA card reader and a staffed ticket window. Access to the opposite side platform is by means of a footbridge. The side platform opposite the station building is labelled platform 3 and the track, like that of platform 1, runs on the north side. A gap exists between platform 3 and 1, suggesting that there was once a platform/track 2 which has since been removed.

Management of the passenger facilities at the station has been outsourced to the JR Kyushu Tetsudou Eigyou Co., a wholly owned subsidiary of JR Kyushu specialising in station services. It staffs the ticket booth which is equipped with a Midori no Madoguchi facility.

Platforms

JR

Adjacent stations

History
On the same day, Kajiki was opened as one of several intermediate stations along the track. The entire stretch of track from Mojikō through Kokubu and Kajiki to Kagoshima was redesignated as the Kagoshima Main Line on 21 November 1909. By 1927, another track from Yatsushiro through  to Kagoshima had been built and this was now designated as part of the Kagoshima Main Line. Kajiki, with the other stations on the older route then became part of the Hisatsu Line on 17 October 1927. The entire stretch of track down the east coast of Kyushu from Kokura through Kajiki to Kagoshima then redesignated as the Nippō Main Line on 6 December 1932. With the privatization of Japanese National Railways (JNR), the successor of JGR, on 1 April 1987, the station came under the control of JR Kyushu.

Passenger statistics
In fiscal 2016, the station was used by an average of 1,773 passengers daily (boarding passengers only), and it ranked 104th among the busiest stations of JR Kyushu.

Nearby places
Aira City Hall Kajiki Branch
Kajiki Post office
Kajiki High School
Kajiki Technical High School
Dajo Elementary School

See also
 List of railway stations in Japan

References

External links

Kajiki (JR Kyushu)

Railway stations in Japan opened in 1901
Railway stations in Kagoshima Prefecture